Regan David Riley (born 12 November 2002) is an English professional footballer who plays for EFL Championship club Norwich City.

Career
Riley joined the Bolton Wanderers F.C. Academy when he was nine years old.

On 17 August 2019, Riley made his Bolton Wanderers debut as a second half substitute in a 5–0 loss away to Tranmere Rovers, in a Bolton team made up largely of youth players, due to financial difficulties. He returned to the U18 for the 20–21 season. Riley was used as a Substitute in the EFL Trophy against Shrewsbury Town, on 6th October 2020. In the 2–1 defeat, he replace Tom White midway through the first-half and completed the game. 

On 1 February 2021, Riley joined Championship side Norwich City on a three-year contract. Norwich paid Bolton £250,000.

Career statistics

Notes

References

2002 births
Living people
Footballers from Bolton
Association football midfielders
English footballers
Bolton Wanderers F.C. players
Norwich City F.C. players
English Football League players